Amalia Miranzo Martínez (31 October 1939 – 20 June 2014) was a Spanish politician from the Spanish Socialist Workers' Party. In 1977 she was elected as member of the Senate Constituent Cortes, being the only female Socialist politician to do so. She also served as member of the Senate of Spain in its two first legislatures (1979–1986).

References

1939 births
2014 deaths
People from Cuenca, Spain
Spanish Socialist Workers' Party politicians
Members of the Senate of Spain
20th-century Spanish politicians
20th-century Spanish women politicians